The women's 63 kg judo event at the 2015 European Games in Baku was held on 26 June at the Heydar Aliyev Arena.

Results

Final

Repechage

Top half

Bottom half

References

External links
 

W63
2015
European W63